The 1991–92 Georgetown Hoyas men's basketball team represented Georgetown University in the 1991–92  NCAA Division I college basketball season. John Thompson, coached them in his 20th season as head coach. They played their home games at the Capital Centre in Landover, Maryland. They were members of the Big East Conference and finished the season with a record of 22–10, 12–6 in Big East play, sharing the regular-season conference championship with Seton Hall and St. John's. Their record earned them a bye in the first round of the 1992 Big East men's basketball tournament, and they advanced to the final before losing to Syracuse. They were the No. 6 seed in the West Region of the 1992 NCAA Division I men's basketball tournament – the last of 14 consecutive Georgetown NCAA tournament appearances – and advanced to the second round before losing to West Region No. 3 seed Florida State. They were ranked No. 22 in the seasons final Associated Press Poll and No. 18 in the final Coaches' Poll.

Season recap

Georgetowns starting lineup of senior center and team co-captain Alonzo Mourning, sophomore basketball Robert Churchwell, senior forward Brian Kelly, sophomore point guard Joey Brown, and freshman guard Irvin Church was so talented that observers picked the Hoyas as a co-favorite to win the 1991-92 Big East regular-season title. With Dikembe Mutombo having graduated in May 1991, Mourning was now Georgetowns sole "big man," and he led the team, starting and scoring in double figures in all 32 games and collecting rebounds in double figures in 22 games. He led the team in scoring in 27 games and in rebounding in 26.

In the first game of the year, Mourning had his second career triple double with 32 points, 14 rebounds, and 10 blocked shots against Hawaii Loa in the Hawaii Loa Classic. Over the next two weeks, he fell just short of two more triple doubles, with 21 points, 22 rebounds, and nine blocked shots against Delaware State and 25 points, 14 rebounds, and five blocked shots in only 27 minutes of play against the University of the District of Columbia. He fell just short of a triple double again in the first Big East game of the year, with 24 points, 15 rebounds, and eight blocked shots against Villanova at the Capital Centre on January 4, 1992. He followed that up with 28 points and 12 rebounds against Providence and 23 points and 11 rebounds against Seton Hall. In the 16 Big East games Georgetown played during the regular season, Mourning averaged 20.7 points and 10.9 rebounds a game, and his expertise in shooting free throws was an important part of the Hoyas offense. His career-high 38-point performance in a double-overtime loss at Boston College included scoring on a school-record 18 free throws as he shot 69.2% from the free throw line in 26 attempts. Three days later, in a rematch in which the Hoyas upset Villanova, he again almost had a triple double against the Wildcats, scoring 26 points, grabbing 11 rebounds, and blocking seven shots as well as shooting 14-for-15 (93.3%) from the free-throw line.

Churchwells sophomore season was virtually a repeat of his freshman year. He shot 49% from the field overall and 38% from three-point range, and he made 120 field goals and had 153 rebounds, an increase of six and one, respectively, from the year before. Although he had only one shot per 3 minutes 32 seconds of playing time, he averaged 9.6 points per game.

Brown improved his shooting from the field, from 23.1% the previous year to 35.2%, but made some of his biggest contributions on defense. On February 19, 1992, 25th-ranked Georgetown faced 21st-ranked Connecticut at the Capital Centre in an important game for the Hoyas for their chances both for a Big East regular season championship and for an NCAA tournament bid. The game was tied 58–58 with 13 seconds left to play and the Huskies holding the ball for the final shot when Brown stole a Connecticut pass and made a layup at the buzzer to give the Hoyas a 60–58 last-second upset win. At 17th-ranked Syracuse four days later, Brown scored 23 points to lead Georgetown to another upset win. Against Pittsburgh at the Capital Centre in the regular-season finale, he had a 17-point effort in a win that tied Georgetown with Seton Hall and St. John's for the regular-season Big East championship.

After a bye in the first round, Georgetown defeated Miami in the quarterfinals of the 1992 Big East tournament and St. Johns in the semifinals. In the final game, the Hoyas met archrival Syracuse. The Hoyas fell 11 points behind the Orangemen in the second half, but the Hoyas, led by Mournings 23 points, came back to tie the game with 24 seconds left to play. Unfortunately for the Hoyas, Syracuse senior forward Dave Johnson connected on a shot with four seconds left to give the Orangemen a 54–52 win. It was Syracuses first defeat of Georgetown in a Big East tournament championship game in four tries. Mourning scored 76 points and 22 rebounds during the tournament, averaging 25.3 points per game, and was named the tournaments Most Valuable Player, becoming the first player ever named the Big East's Player of the Year, Defensive Player of the Year, and Tournament MVP in the same season, and only the second Tournament MVP from a team that did not win the tournament.

The Hoyas were the No. 6 seed in the West Region of the 1992 NCAA Division I men's basketball tournament – the last of 14 consecutive Georgetown NCAA Tournament appearances. In the first round, they defeated South Florida, with Mourning scoring 21 points and pulling down 11 rebounds. They met the West Region No. 3 seed, 20th-ranked Florida State, in the second round. The Seminoles largely denied Mourning the ball, and in the last game of his collegiate career he had only three rebounds and seven field goal attempts, making four of them. Meanwhile, Florida State junior point guard Sam Cassell scored 19 points and sophomore forward Doug Edwards had 15 points and 16 rebounds, and the Seminoles defeated the Hoyas 78–68 in one of the biggest wins in Florida State basketball history. It was the third straight season that Georgetown had been eliminated in the second round of the NCAA Tournament. The Hoyas were ranked No. 22 in the seasons final Associated Press Poll and No. 18 in the final Coaches' Poll.

During the season, Mourning had averaged 21.3 points, 10.7 rebounds, and 5.0 blocked shots per game, shooting 59.5% from the field and 75.9% from the free-throw line. He graduated in May 1992 as one of the greatest players in Georgetown men's basketball history. During his four-year career, he had averaged 16.6 points, 8.6 rebounds, and 3.8 blocked shots per game. Still, he had never led his team to a Final Four appearance, even with Dikembe Mutombo as his teammate the first three seasons. This was largely because an unusually high number of scholarship players – 11 of 23 – transferred from Georgetown between 1987–1988 and 1992–1993, preventing the team from building a core of veterans to play with its two dominating centers. Without that core of veterans, the Mourning-Mutombo teams were unable to replicate the success of the veteran-filled Patrick Ewing teams of the early 1980s, which had reached the Final Four – and indeed the national championship game – three times in four seasons.

Roster
Source

Senior guard Ronny Thompson was the son of head coach John Thompson, Jr.

Rankings

Source

1991–92 Schedule and results
Sources
 All times are Eastern

|-
!colspan=9 style="background:#002147; color:#8D817B;"| Regular Season

|-
!colspan=9 style="background:#002147; color:#8D817B;"| Big East tournament

|-
!colspan=9 style="background:#002147; color:#8D817B;"| NCAA tournament

References

Georgetown Hoyas men's basketball seasons
Georgetown Hoyas
Georgetown
Georgetown Hoyas men's basketball team
Georgetown Hoyas men's basketball team